The Loved Ones is an EP by the American punk rock band The Loved Ones. It was released on February 22, 2005 by Jade Tree Records, who had previously released albums by Trial by Fire and Kid Dynamite, bands the members of The Loved Ones formerly played in.

The EP was the band's first release through a label, as they previously only self-released a four-song demo. Two of the songs on this EP, "Chicken" and "Candy Cane", were also on that demo. The band followed this with their debut album, Keep Your Heart, which was released just over a year later. That album featured "100K" which originally appeared on this EP.

Track listing
All songs by Dave Hause unless otherwise noted.
 "100K" – 2:54
 "Chicken" (Hause, Sneeringer) – 2:50
 "Massive" – 3:54
 "Drastic" – 2:51
 "Candy Cane" (Hause, Sneeringer) – 3:15

Credits
 Dave Hause – vocals, guitar
 Michael Cotterman – bass
 Mike Sneeringer – drums

References

2005 EPs
The Loved Ones (American band) albums
Jade Tree (record label) EPs